Una Merkel (December 10, 1903 – January 2, 1986) was an American stage, film, radio, and television actress.

Merkel was born in Kentucky and acted on stage in New York in the 1920s. She went to Hollywood in 1930 and became a popular film actress. Two of her best-known performances are in the films 42nd Street and Destry Rides Again. She won a Tony Award in 1956 and was nominated for an Oscar in 1961.

Life and career
Merkel was born in Covington, Kentucky, to Bessie (née Phares) and Arno Merkel. In her early childhood, she lived in many of the Southern United States due to her father's job as a traveling salesman. At the age of 15, she and her parents moved to Philadelphia. They stayed there a year or so before settling in New York City, where she began attending the Alviene School of Dramatic Art.

Because of her strong resemblance to actress Lillian Gish, Merkel was offered a part as Gish's youngest sister in a silent film called World Shadows. However, the funding for the film dried up and it was never completed. Merkel went on to appear in a few silent movies, several of them for the Lee Bradford Corporation. She also appeared in the two-reel Love's Old Sweet Song (1923), which was made by Lee de Forest in his Phonofilm sound-on-film process and starred Louis Wolheim and Helen Weir. Not making much of a mark in films, Merkel turned her attention to the theater and found work in several important plays on Broadway. Her biggest triumph was in Coquette (1927), which starred her idol, Helen Hayes.

Invited to Hollywood by famous director D. W. Griffith to play Ann Rutledge in his film Abraham Lincoln (1930), Merkel became a big success in sound films. During the 1930s, she became a popular second lead in a number of films, usually playing the wisecracking best friend of the heroine, supporting actresses such as Jean Harlow, Carole Lombard, Loretta Young, and Eleanor Powell.

Merkel was known for her Kewpie-doll looks, strong Southern accent, and wry line delivery. She played Sam Spade's secretary in the original 1931 version of The Maltese Falcon. Merkel was a Metro-Goldwyn-Mayer contract player from 1932 to 1938, appearing in as many as 12 films in a year, often on loan-out to other studios. She was also often cast as leading lady opposite Jack Benny, Harold Lloyd, Franchot Tone, and Charles Butterworth, among others.

In 42nd Street (1933), Merkel played a streetwise show girl. In the famous "Shuffle Off to Buffalo" number, Merkel and Ginger Rogers sang the verse: "Matrimony is baloney. She'll be wanting alimony in a year or so./Still they go and shuffle, shuffle off to Buffalo." Merkel appeared in both the 1934 and the 1952 film versions of The Merry Widow, playing different roles. She received second billing in The Good Old Soak (1937) with Wallace Beery and Ted Healy in the same year that Healy died mysteriously.

One of her most famous roles was in the Western comedy Destry Rides Again (1939), in which her character, Lily Belle, gets into a famous "cat-fight" with Frenchie (Marlene Dietrich) over the possession of her husband's trousers, won by Frenchie in a crooked card game. She played the elder daughter to the W. C. Fields character, Egbert Sousé, in the 1940 film The Bank Dick. Her film career went into decline during the 1940s, although she continued working in smaller productions. In 1950, she starred with William Bendix in the baseball comedy Kill the Umpire, which was a surprise hit.

She made a comeback as a middle-aged woman playing mothers and maiden aunts, and in 1956 won a Tony Award for her role on Broadway in The Ponder Heart, adapted from the novella of the same name. She had a major part in the MGM 1959 film The Mating Game as Paul Douglas's character's wife and Debbie Reynolds' character's mother, and was nominated for an Academy Award for Best Supporting Actress in Summer and Smoke (1961). She was also featured as Brian Keith's character's housekeeper, Verbena, in the Walt Disney comedy The Parent Trap in 1961. Her final film role was opposite Elvis Presley in Spinout (1966).

Personal life
On March 5, 1945, Merkel was nearly killed when her mother Bessie, with whom she shared an apartment in New York City, died by suicide by gassing herself. Merkel was overcome by the five gas jets her mother had turned on in their kitchen and was found unconscious in her bedroom.

On March 4, 1952, seven years almost to the day after her mother died, Merkel overdosed on sleeping pills. She was found unconscious by a nurse who was caring for her at the time and remained in a coma for a day before recovering.

Merkel was a lifelong Methodist.

Marriage
Merkel was married once and had no children. She married North American Aviation executive Ronald L. Burla in 1932. They separated in April 1944. Merkel filed for divorce on December 19, 1946, in Miami, and it was granted in March 1947.

Death
On January 2, 1986, Merkel died in Los Angeles at the age of 82. She is buried near her parents, Arno and Bessie Merkel, in Highland Cemetery in Fort Mitchell, Kentucky.

For her contribution to the motion picture industry, Una Merkel has a star on the Hollywood Walk of Fame (6230 Hollywood Boulevard). In 1991, a historical marker was dedicated to her in her hometown of Covington.

Filmography

Television

References

Further reading

External links

 
 
 Photographs of Covington, Kentucky's Una Merkel
 Photographs of Una Merkel
 

1903 births
1986 deaths
20th-century American actresses
20th-century Methodists
Actresses from Kentucky
American film actresses
American radio actresses
American stage actresses
American television actresses
American United Methodists
Burials in Kentucky
Metro-Goldwyn-Mayer contract players
People from Covington, Kentucky
Tony Award winners